is an architectural style born in Japan during the Muromachi period from the fusion of elements from three different antecedent styles: wayō,  daibutsuyō, and zenshūyō. It is exemplified by the main hall at Kakurin-ji.  The combination of wayō and daibutsuyō in particular became so frequent that sometimes it is classed separately by scholars under the name .

See also
Japanese Buddhist architecture - Heian period
Daibutsuyō
Wayō
Zenshūyō

Notes

Bibliography

Japanese Buddhist architecture
Japanese architectural history